Kailashpati Mishra  (5 October 1923 – 3 November 2012) was an Indian politician.  He was a leader of Jana Sangh, and later Bharatiya Janta Party. He was Finance Minister of Bihar in 1977. He was Governor of Gujarat from May 2003 to July 2004.

Early life
Kailashpati Mishra was born in Dudharchak, Buxar, Bihar, into a Bhumihar family on 5 October 1923. He took part in the Quit India Movement in 1942 and was arrested for the same. He was a member of the Rashtriya Swayamsevak Sangh from 1943, and was even jailed after the assassination of Mahatma Gandhi. While studying in class X, Mr. Mishra was arrested for picketing at the main gate of his school at Buxar in support of 1942 Quit India Movement.

Political career
Kailash Pati Mishra contested 1971 Lok Sabha election on Jana Sangh's ticket from Patna but lost. He won the Bihar Vidhan Sabha election for Bikram seat in 1977, and was appointed finance minister in the Janata Party government of Karpoori Thakur.  
In 1980, he became the first BJP Bihar president when the party was founded. He also served as BJP national Vice President from 1995 to 2003. He was appointed governor of Gujarat in 2003, and for a short duration he was caretaker Governor of Rajasthan following the death of the incumbent Governor Nirmal Chandra Jain. After the BJP's government's defeat in 2004 polls, Mishra was removed from his post as governor by the Congress Government.

Known as the Bhishma Pitamaha of the Bharatiya Janata Party in Bihar, Mishra was away from direct political activities for the last two years of his life due to old age, but remained a source of inspiration for the party. He was also liked by the socialists due to his participation in JP's 1974 anti-Congress agitations.

Born in 1923 in Bihar's Buxar, Mishra was a lifelong bachelor.

On his death in 2012 at the age of 89, Chief Minister Nitish Kumar, his deputy and senior Bihar BJP leader Sushil Kumar Modi visited his residence to pay condolence. Indian government issued a postal stamp in his honour in 2016.

References

1923 births
2012 deaths
Bharatiya Janata Party politicians from Bihar
Indian independence activists from Bihar
Indian autobiographers
Indian Hindus
Indian memoirists
Governors of Gujarat
Governors of Rajasthan
Members of the Bihar Legislative Assembly
Rajya Sabha members from Bihar
People from Buxar district
Bharatiya Jana Sangh politicians
Janata Party politicians